The Hypeninae are a subfamily of moths in the family Erebidae. The taxon was first described by Gottlieb August Wilhelm Herrich-Schäffer in 1851. A notable species is Mecistoptera griseifusa, which lives solely on tears it drinks with its proboscis.

Taxonomy

The subfamily was previously classified in the family Noctuidae.  Several genera that were previously classified in the subfamily have been moved to the Rivulinae and Boletobiinae subfamilies of Erebidae, leaving the Hypeninae as a group of genera closely related to the type genus Hypena.

Genera

Aethalina
Arrade
Artigisa
Avirostrum
Britha
Calathusa
Catada
Catadoides
Colobochyla
Dichromia
Elaphristis
Epitripta
Esthlodora
Foveades
Goniocraspedon
Goniophylla
Harita
Hypena
Hypenarana
Hypertrocta
Lophotoma
Lysimelia
Mecistoptera
Meyrickella
Naarda
Panilla
Paonidia
Parilyrgis
Paurophylla
Pherechoa
Philogethes
Prionopterina
Rhodina
Rhynchina
Rhynchodontodes
Sandava
Sarobela
Stenopaltis
Synolulis
Tigrana

References

 
Moth subfamilies